The United States Army Transportation Corps (USATC) S200 Class is a class of 2-8-2 steam locomotive.  They were introduced in 1941 and lent-leased to the United Kingdom for use in the Middle East during World War II.

Service

Middle East
At least 85 S200s operated in the Middle East, including Egypt, Palestine and Lebanon. One was destroyed by fire at El Arish in Egypt in 1942. 29 of this batch was later supplied to Turkey where they became the TCDD 46201 Class. In 1946, another 24 were transferred to TCDD which added them to the same number series 46201–46253. 51 S200s built in 1942 served on the Trans-Iranian Railway, where they became Iranian class 42.

Europe
After the Allied invasion of Italy, 31 S200s were transferred and used there. 30 of these entered FS stock as FS Class 747 Nos. 747.001–747.030; the other one caught fire and was destroyed.

Asia
Thirty were donated to China by the UNRRA. China Railway designated these as class ㄇㄎ10（MK10）in 1951, then reclassifying them as class 解放10 (JF10, Jiefang, "Liberation") and numbering them 3711−3740.

Survivors
Two of the Turkish locomotives survive: 46224 at Ankara and 46244 at the Çamlık Railway Museum.

References

External links
 Alexandros Gregoriou: The USATC steam locomotives in Greece, 1947, 1959
 Trains of Turkey: 46201 to 46253

2-8-2 locomotives
S200
War Department locomotives
ALCO locomotives
Baldwin locomotives
Lima locomotives
Railway locomotives introduced in 1942
Steam locomotives of Iran
Steam locomotives of Lebanon
Steam locomotives of China
Steam locomotives of Turkey
Steam locomotives of Mandatory Palestine
Standard gauge steam locomotives of Egypt
Standard gauge locomotives of Iran
Standard gauge locomotives of Lebanon
Standard gauge locomotives of China
Standard gauge locomotives of Turkey
Standard gauge locomotives of Mandatory Palestine
1′D1′ h2 locomotives
Freight locomotives